Harry Anderson Winter (February 3, 1889 – May 30, 1969) was a lawyer, journalist, judge and political figure in Newfoundland and Labrador. He represented Port de Grave from 1923 to 1924 and Harbour Grace from 1932 to 1934 in the Newfoundland and Labrador House of Assembly.

He was born Henry Anderson Winter in St. John's, the son of James Spearman Winter and Emily Julia Coen. He was educated at Bishop Feild College and at Oxford University. Winter was called to the bar in 1911. In 1916, he became editor of the Evening Telegram. Winter was speaker for the Newfoundland assembly from 1923 to 1924. He left politics in 1924 and then ran unsuccessfully for a seat in the Newfoundland assembly in 1928. Also in 1928, he was named King's Counsel. He served in the Executive Council as a minister without portfolio from 1932 to 1934. Winter served in the Commission of Government as Commissioner for Home Affairs and Education from 1941 to 1944 and Commissioner for Justice and Defence from 1944 to 1947. He was a justice in the Supreme Court of Newfoundland and Labrador from 1947 to 1964.

In 1916, Winter married Francis Goodridge. He died in St. John's at the age of 72.

His brother James also served as speaker for the Newfoundland assembly.

References 

1889 births
1969 deaths
Bishop Feild School alumni
Dominion of Newfoundland judges
Speakers of the Newfoundland and Labrador House of Assembly
Dominion of Newfoundland politicians
Government ministers of the Dominion of Newfoundland
Members of the Newfoundland Commission of Government